The 2007 All-Big Ten Conference football team consists of American football players chosen as All-Big Ten Conference players for the 2007 NCAA Division I-A football season.  The conference recognizes two official All-Big Ten selectors: (1) the Big Ten conference coaches selected separate offensive and defensive units and named first- and second-team players (the "Coaches" team); and (2) a panel of sports writers and broadcasters covering the Big Ten also selected offensive and defensive units and named first- and second-team players (the "Media" team).

Offensive selections

Quarterbacks
 Chad Henne, Michigan (Coaches-1)
 Todd Boeckman, Ohio State (Coaches-HM; Media-1)
 Kellen Lewis, Indiana (Coaches-2; Media-2)

Running backs
 Rashard Mendenhall, Illinois (Coaches-1; Media-1)
 Beanie Wells, Ohio State (Coaches-1; Media-1)
 Mike Hart, Michigan (Coaches-2; Media-2)
 Javon Ringer, Michigan State (Coaches-2; Media-2)

Receivers
 James Hardy, Indiana (Coaches-1; Media-1)
 Mario Manningham, Michigan (Coaches-1; Media-1)
 Devin Thomas, Michigan State (Coaches-2; Media-2)
 Dorien Bryant, Purdue (Coaches-2; Media-2)

Centers
 A. Q. Shipley, Penn State (Coaches-1)
 Marcus Coleman, Wisconsin (Media-1)

Guards
 Martin O'Donnell, Illinois (Coaches-1; Media-1)
 Adam Kraus, Michigan (Coaches-1; Media-1)

Tackles
 Jake Long, Michigan (Coaches-1; Media-1)
 Kirk Barton, Ohio State (Coaches-1; Media-1)

Tight ends
 Travis Beckum, Wisconsin (Coaches-1; Media-1)
 Dustin Keller, Purdue (Coaches-2; Media-2)

Defensive selections

Defensive linemen
 Greg Middleton, Indiana (Coaches-1; Media-1)
 Vernon Gholston, Ohio State (Coaches-1; Media-1)
 Maurice Evans, Penn State (Coaches-1; Media-1)
 Mitch King, Iowa (Coaches-1; Media-2)
 Jonal Saint-Dic, Michigan State (Coaches-2; Media-1)

Linebackers
 Jeremy Leman, Illinois (Coaches-1; Media-1)
 James Laurinaitis, Ohio State (Coaches-1; Media-1)
 Dan Connor, Penn State (Coaches-1; Media-1)

Defensive backs
 Malcolm Jenkins, Ohio State (Coaches-1; Media-1)
 Justin King, Penn State (Coaches-1; Media-1)
 Jack Ikegwuonu, Wisconsin (Coaches-1; Media-1)
 Vontae Davis, Illinois (Coaches-1; Media-2)
 Tracy Porter, Indiana (Coaches-2; Media-1)
 Jamar Adams, Michigan (Coaches-2; Media-2)

Special teams

Kickers
 Taylor Mehlhaff, Wisconsin (Coaches-1; Media-2)
 Austin Starr, Indiana (Coaches-2; Media-1)

Punters
 Jeremy Boone, Penn State (Coaches-1; Media-1)
 Ken DeBauche, Wisconsin (Coaches-2)
 Justin Kucek, Minnesota (Media-2)

Key
Bold = selected as a first-team player by both the coaches and media panel

Coaches = selected by Big Ten Conference coaches

Media = selected by a media panel

HM = Honorable mention

See also
 2007 College Football All-America Team

References

All-Big Ten Conference
All-Big Ten Conference football teams